Ben Kavanagh (14 February 1905 – 9 January 1978) was an Australian rules footballer who played for the Essendon Football Club and North Melbourne Football Club in the Victorian Football League (VFL).

Notes

External links 
		

1905 births
1978 deaths
Australian rules footballers from Victoria (Australia)
Essendon Football Club players
North Melbourne Football Club players